Group B was one of four groups of national teams competing in the second stage of the 1982 FIFA World Cup. The group's three matches were staged at the Santiago Bernabéu in Madrid. The group consisted of three teams advancing from the first group stage: Group 2 winners West Germany, Group 5 runners-up, the host nation Spain, and Group 4 winners England. England finished the group without scoring or conceding a single goal, the only time that has ever happened in any kind of group in FIFA World Cup history. Like Scotland in '74 and Brazil in '78, Three Lions of '82 stayed unbeaten but were eliminated before the semifinals.

West Germany topped the group and advanced to the semi-finals.

Qualified teams
The winners of Group 2 and 4 and the runner-up of Group 5 qualified for Group B of the second round.

Standings

Matches

West Germany vs England

West Germany vs Spain

Spain vs England

References

External links
 1982 FIFA World Cup archive
 Spain 1982 FIFA Technical Report: Statistical Details of the Matches pp. 137-140

Group B
Group B
Group B
Group B